Omniplex Cinemas is a cinema chain in Ireland set up in 1991. It is operated by Paul Anderson. It operates cinemas throughout Ireland. In 2013, Omniplex began a €14.5m investment and renovation in a number of its cinemas including the rolling out across Ireland of its large screen format OmniplexMAXX.

Omniplex owns 34 cinemas, with 20 cinemas in the Republic of Ireland and 15 cinemas in Northern Ireland.

Company history
The Anderson family have a long history in the film and cinema business dating back to 1948 when Kevin Anderson (Paul Anderson's father now retired) first started a film distribution business. The first films acquired were The Hills of Donegal and The Rose of Tralee, which were distributed to cinemas across Ireland.

The first cinema was purchased in Lucan in 1955, where company Chairman and Managing Director Paul Anderson started working at 8 years old before officially entering the business at 18.

The Andersons continued to acquire, redevelop and sell cinemas across Ireland over the subsequent decades. Their biggest acquisition came when they bought the Rank Cinemas portfolio in 1988, which included Dublin's flagship Savoy cinema and The Screen cinema, which the Andersons jointly owned as part of the Dublin Cinema Group until 2013.

The origins of Omniplex lie with the evolution of multiplex cinemas in the early 1990s. The first cinema to be branded an Omniplex was in Santry (now IMC). Since then Omniplex have expanded in both the Republic of Ireland and Northern Ireland, there are 23 Omniplex cinemas currently operating. This includes the 13 screen Cork Omniplex which opened in 2005 and the Rathmines Omniplex which completed in 2014 following a 15-year campaign to open cinemas in The Swan SC, which the Andersons acquired in 1999.

The company announced the acquisition of the Quayside cinema in Balbriggan, which was bought from NAMA and refurbished at a cost of €1.5m.

As well as screening films Omniplex cinemas also show live events that are broadcast from around the world. This includes weekly live show from New York's Met Opera, The Bolshoi Ballet and music concerts.

Omniplex are reported to sell 5.5m cinema tickets per year.

Acquiring of the Gaiety Cinema Group
In May 2015 it was announced that Omniplex had bought the Gaiety Cinema Group (GCG) in an €8m deal. GCG owned two cinemas in Sligo and Arklow, in the Bridgewater Shopping Centre

OmniplexMAXX
The OmniplexMAXX is the next generation of giant format cinemas screens being rolled out across Omniplex's cinemas. This includes the OmniplexMAXX in Antrim which, at 23 metres wide, is Ireland's widest cinema screen. Other OmniplexMAXX screens have opened in Mahon, Cork, Limerick, Banbridge, Waterford and Rathmines, which opened in 2014 with the Irish premier of The Inbetweeners 2. New OmniplexMAXX screens are planned in Dundonald and Dundalk. The auditoriums include custom-designed leather reclining armchairs as standard, HD digital projection, MasterImage 3D and Dolby Atmos surround sound.

Omniparks
In 2015 Omniplex launched OmniPark, the new leisure park brand covering four of the parks that company owns, on which it has cinemas. Omniparks are located in Dundonald, Craigavon, Bangor and Omagh.

Ward Anderson Court Case

The Andersons were formerly partners of the Wards, owners of Irish Multiplex Cinemas in the Ward Anderson cinemas empire. However, two families fell out after the Andersons signed a deal to build a cinema on the Stephen's Green shopping centre, without notifying, or involving the Wards in the new cinema. The new cinema would have been in direct competition with their jointly owned cinemas in Dublin city centre, The Savoy, and The Screen. This resulted in a long-running legal struggle that led to a major case in Four Courts in which the Ward and Anderson families eventually agreed to split their cinema empire in January 2013.
 
The agreement to divide the assets allocated 23 cinemas to the Anderson family including the 13-screen Cork Omniplex and 22 other cinemas in their Omniplex Cinemas Group. The Ward family were allocated 12 cinemas in their Irish Multiplex Cinemas group, including the Savoy and Screen cinemas in Dublin.

Paul Anderson is the son of Kevin Anderson who is one of the co-founders of Ward Anderson.

Cinema locations

Republic of Ireland

Northern Ireland

References

External links
 Omniplex Cinemas

Cinema chains in the Republic of Ireland